Sachs' Disease (original title: La Maladie de Sachs) is a 1999 French drama film directed by Michel Deville from a novel by Martin Winckler. It won the French Syndicate of Cinema Critics Prix Méliès, and received César nominations for Best Actor, Best Director and Best Writing.

Plot 
Dr. Bruno Sachs, the only medical practitioner in a small French town, seems on the surface to be compassionate and dedicated. However, in private he is not happy in his work and does not like most of his patients, which include a heart patient who refuses life-saving surgery, and a man whose wife wants sex three times a day, the strain of which is causing his body to wear out. To supplement his income, Dr. Sachs performs abortions in a nearby town. Here he meets Pauline Kasser, a young woman, and they are attracted to each other. While she is not interested in a traditional courtship, she would like to consummate their relationship. A few days later she bumps into him in a book shop, and their relationship seems to start to blossom.

Cast 
Albert Dupontel - Doctor Bruno Sachs
Valérie Dréville - Pauline Kasser
Dominique Reymond - Madame Leblanc
Étienne Bierry - M. Renard
Nathalie Boutefeu - Viviane
Béatrice Bruno - Angèle Pujade
Gilles Charmot - Georges
Christine Brücher - Annie's mother
Cécile Arnaud - Madame Bailly's neighbor
Serge Riaboukine - The drunk
Albert Delpy - The pharmacy client
Nicolas Marié - The fireman's captain

References

External links 

1999 films
Films directed by Michel Deville
Medical-themed films
1999 drama films
French drama films
Films based on French novels
1990s French films